Natalie Thurlow (née Campbell) is a New Zealand curler.

On international level she is runner-up and five-time bronze medallist of Pacific Curling Championships.

On national level she is six-time New Zealand women's curling champion (2005, 2006, 2010, 2011, 2012, 2018) and two-time New Zealand mixed doubles curling champion (2012, 2013).

Teams and events

Women's

Mixed doubles

Personal life

References

External links

 Video: 

Living people
New Zealand female curlers
New Zealand curling champions

Year of birth missing (living people)
Place of birth missing (living people)